Damyean Da'Kethe Dotson (born May 6, 1994) is an American professional basketball player for the Gaziantep Basketbol of the Basketbol Süper Ligi (BSL). He played college basketball for Oregon and Houston before being selected with the 44th pick of the 2017 NBA draft by the Knicks.

College career
He played two seasons for the University of Oregon. After his sophomore season, he and teammates Dominic Artis and Brandon Austin were dismissed due to sexual assault allegations. No one was ever charged due to a lack of evidence and conflicting statements made by the victim. He subsequently enrolled at Houston Community College where he did not play basketball but took anger management courses with John Lucas II.

He transferred to the University of Houston. As a senior, he averaged 17.4 points and 6.9 rebounds per game and was named to the First Team American Athletic Conference.

Professional career

New York Knicks (2017–2020)

On August 7, 2017, Dotson signed with the Knicks and during his rookie season, he received multiple assignments to the Westchester Knicks of the NBA G League. On November 29, Dotson became the eleventh player in history to play in the G League and NBA in the same day. On April 6, 2018, Dotson scored a career high 30 points and a career high 11 rebounds in a 122–98 win off the bench against the Miami Heat.

Cleveland Cavaliers (2020–2021)
On November 25, 2020, Dotson signed with the Cleveland Cavaliers. On September 10, 2021, Dotson was waived by the Cavaliers.

Austin Spurs (2021)
On October 14, 2021, Dotson was signed by the San Antonio Spurs. However, he was waived two days later and joined their G League affiliate, the Austin Spurs on October 27. In 12 games, he averaged 12.9 points, 5.6 rebounds and 3.9 assists over 34.9 minutes per game.

New York Knicks (2021–2022) 
On December 21, 2021, Dotson was signed by the New York Knicks. Dotson was signed on a 10-day deal, via New York's 'hardship' exception. He signed a second 10-day contract with the Knicks on December 31.

Return to Austin (2022) 
On January 11, 2022, Dotson was reacquired by the Austin Spurs.

Gaziantep (2022–present)
On June 23, 2022, Dotson signed with Gaziantep Basketbol of the Basketball Super League.

Career statistics

NBA

Regular season

|-
| style="text-align:left;"|
| style="text-align:left;"|New York
| 44 || 2 || 10.8 || .447 || .324 || .696 || 1.9 || 0.7 || .3 || .0 || 4.1
|-
| style="text-align:left;"|
| style="text-align:left;"|New York
| 73 || 40 || 27.5 || .415 || .368 || .745 || 3.6 || 1.8 || .8 || .1 || 10.7
|-
| style="text-align:left;"|
| style="text-align:left;"|New York
| 48 || 0 || 17.4 || .414 || .362 || .667 || 1.9 || 1.2 || .5 || .1 || 6.7
|-
| style="text-align:left;"|
| style="text-align:left;"|Cleveland
| 46 || 7 || 19.7 || .406 || .289 || .667 || 2.0 || 2.0 || .3 || .1 || 6.7
|-
| style="text-align:left;"|
| style="text-align:left;"|New York
| 2 || 0 || 10.5 || .500 || .000 ||  || 1.0 || .5 || .0 || .0 || 2.0
|- class="sortbottom"
| style="text-align:center;" colspan="2"|Career
| 213 || 49 || 19.9 || .417 || .345 || .711 || 2.5 || 1.5 || .5 || .1 || 7.5

College

|-
| style="text-align:left;"|2012–13
| style="text-align:left;"|Oregon
| 37 || 36 || 27.9 || .439 || .329 || .723 || 3.5 || .9 || .9 || .1 || 11.4
|-
| style="text-align:left;"|2013–14
| style="text-align:left;"|Oregon
| 33 || 33 || 23.8 || .438 || .313 || .803 || 3.2 || 1.2 || .5 || .2 || 9.4
|-
| style="text-align:left;"|2015–16
| style="text-align:left;"|Houston
| 32 || 32 || 31.0 || .506 || .367 || .833 || 6.8 || 1.3 || .7 || .2 || 13.9
|-
| style="text-align:left;"|2016–17
| style="text-align:left;"|Houston
| 32 || 32 || 34.3 || .470 || .443 || .830 || 6.9 || 1.1 || .9 || .2 || 17.4
|- class="sortbottom"
| style="text-align:center;" colspan="2"|Career
| 134 || 133 || 29.1 || .464 || .380 || .796 || 5.0 || 1.1 || .8 || .2 || 12.9

References

External links

 Houston Cougars bio 

1994 births
Living people
21st-century African-American sportspeople
African-American basketball players
American men's basketball players
Austin Spurs players
Basketball players from Houston
Cleveland Cavaliers players
Gaziantep Basketbol players
Houston Cougars men's basketball players
New York Knicks draft picks
New York Knicks players
Oregon Ducks men's basketball players
Shooting guards
Westchester Knicks players